Luan Bo (born April 16, 1965 in Harbin, Heilongjiang) is a Chinese figure skating coach and former competitive pair skater. With partner Yao Bin, she was the first pair skater to represent China at the World Figure Skating Championships.

In the closed society of mid-20th century China, Luan and Yao had only photographs from which to learn their moves. At the 1980 World Figure Skating Championships in Dortmund, West Germany, they finished 15th, in last place. They competed at the World Championships twice more in 1981 and 1982, finishing last both times. They represented China at the 1984 Winter Olympics and placed 15th.

She works as a coach. Her current and former students include Ding Yang & Ren Zhongfei, Sui Wenjing & Han Cong,  and Zhu Qiuying.

Competitive highlights
(with Yao Bin)

References

 Sports-reference profile
 Skatabase: 1980s Worlds

Chinese female pair skaters
Figure skaters at the 1984 Winter Olympics
Chinese figure skating coaches
Olympic figure skaters of China
Figure skaters from Harbin
Universiade medalists in figure skating
1965 births
Living people
Female sports coaches
Universiade bronze medalists for China
Competitors at the 1983 Winter Universiade